Kasibu, officially the Municipality of Kasibu, is a 3rd class municipality in the province of Nueva Vizcaya, Philippines. According to the 2020 census, it has a population of 41,776 people.

Etymology
Kasibu comes from the Ilongot dialect, which denotes a venue where people settle their differences.

History

Long before the opening of the municipal district of Kasibu, there was a school and a constabulary detachment for the Ilongots, which necessitated the establishment of a kind of government to administer the place. For this reason, the provincial board during Governor Alfonso Castañeda's time requested the Governor-General to authorize the establishment of this place as a provisional municipal district to be supervised and administered by the provincial board through the office of the provincial governor.

By virtue of Executive Order No. 59, signed on 1 January 1926 by Governor General Leonard Wood, Kasibu was established as part of the Municipal District of Bambang. However, by virtue of a Proclamation issued by Governor Leon Cabarroguis in 1933, the Municipal District of Kasibu was reorganized as a Municipal District. On 9 November 1950, Executive Order No. 368, signed by President Elpidio Quirino, abolished the municipal district structure in government and reattached Kasibu to Bambang. The very low population caused the abolition, as residents started to evacuate and abandon Kasibu due to the presence of dissidents from 1950 to 1955. On 9 January 1956, when peace and order was restored, President Ramon Magsaysay issued Executive Order No. 160 creating Kasibu as a separate municipality, but losing territorial jurisdiction over some of its barrios specifically Payupay, Belance, Oyao, Teguep, Manacgoc, Pangancan and Munguia, all on the eastern side in favor of Dupax del Norte.

Geography

Barangays
Kasibu is politically subdivided into 30 barangays. These barangays are headed by elected officials: Barangay Captain, Barangay Council, whose members are called Barangay Councilors. All are elected every three years.

Climate

Demographics

Economy

Government
Kasibu, belonging to the lone congressional district of the province of Nueva Vizcaya, is governed by a mayor designated as its local chief executive and by a municipal council as its legislative body in accordance with the Local Government Code. The mayor, vice mayor, and the councilors are elected directly by the people through an election which is being held every three years.

Elected officials

Education
The Schools Division of Nueva Vizcaya governs the town's public education system. The division office is a field office of the DepEd in Cagayan Valley region. The office governs the public and private elementary and public and private high schools throughout the municipality.

Gallery

See also
 OceanaGold

References

External links

[ Philippine Standard Geographic Code]
Philippine Census Information
Local Governance Performance Management System

Municipalities of Nueva Vizcaya
Establishments by Philippine executive order